Michelle Collins (born February 12, 1971) is an American track and field athlete, known for long sprints.  She was the 2003 World Indoor Champion at 200 metres.  Her 22.18 from that meet would clearly be an American record, but it was never ratified.  Her career came to an apparent end when she was handed an 8-year suspension for using Performance-enhancing drugs, after she was linked to the BALCO Scandal.  She never tested positive but admitted using THG and EPO.  Her results were retroactively disqualified.  After some legal wrangling, Collins threatened to appeal the decision by USADA.  She agreed to drop her appeal and her suspension was reduced to the more conventional 4-year ban.

References

External links

1971 births
Living people
American female sprinters
Doping cases in athletics
American sportspeople in doping cases
Athletes (track and field) at the 2000 Summer Olympics
Olympic track and field athletes of the United States
Pan American Games medalists in athletics (track and field)
Pan American Games silver medalists for the United States
Universiade medalists in athletics (track and field)
Goodwill Games medalists in athletics
Athletes (track and field) at the 1999 Pan American Games
Universiade gold medalists for the United States
World Athletics Indoor Championships medalists
World Athletics Championships winners
Medalists at the 1991 Summer Universiade
Medalists at the 1993 Summer Universiade
Competitors at the 2001 Goodwill Games
Competitors at the 1994 Goodwill Games
Medalists at the 1999 Pan American Games
Goodwill Games gold medalists in athletics
Olympic female sprinters
21st-century American women